Millowitsch may refer to:

 Willy Millowitsch (1909–1999), German actor and playwright
 Peter Millowitsch (born 1949), German actor and current director of Volkstheater Millowitsch
 Mariele Millowitsch (born 1955), German actress
 Volkstheater Millowitsch, a traditional Cologne theatre